Brian Harman (born January 19, 1987) is an American professional golfer who plays on the PGA Tour.  He is one of the few ambidextrous players on tour.

Amateur career
In college, Harman was a three-time 2nd Team All-American on the University of Georgia golf team.  He won the 2005 NCAA Preview and the 2006 Isleworth Invitational. He also won the yearly award for highest Grade Point Average three times.

In 2003, Harman won the U.S. Junior Amateur. He won the Players Amateur in 2005, and the Porter Cup in 2007, shooting a tournament record 22-under-par 258.

Harman played on the winning 2005 and 2009 Walker Cup and 2007 Palmer Cup teams.

Professional career
In 2010, Harman played mostly on the EGolf Professional Tour finishing in the top-10 in 11 of his 14 starts.  He gained his first pro victory at the Manor Classic where he won by three shots. He also played in three Nationwide Tour events in 2010. His best showing came at the Stadion Athens Classic at UGA where he placed T-18th on his former college course.

Harman was known for a unique situation at the 2012 Players Championship. He was the first alternate when D. A. Points withdrew just minutes before his tee time. Playing partners Carl Pettersson and Robert Garrigus had already teed off and after consulting with the PGA, tournament officials allowed Harman to tee off alone for the first round. Harman eventually got partnered with Ryan Moore and Bud Cauley for round two after Paul Casey withdrew. Harman made the cut and finished T51.

Harman later qualified for his first major, the 2012 U.S. Open. His first PGA Tour win was the 2014 John Deere Classic. In 2015, Harman held the 54 hole lead at the Travelers Championship, but would miss the playoff, won by Bubba Watson, by one stroke and finished in solo third.

On August 30, 2015, at The Barclays at Plainfield Country Club in Edison, New Jersey, Harman became the third player in PGA Tour history to have two aces in the same round.

On May 7, 2017, Harman won the Wells Fargo Championship held at Eagle Point Golf Club in Wilmington, North Carolina, for his second PGA Tour win. Harman made a 28-foot putt on the 18th hole to win by one stroke over Dustin Johnson and Pat Perez, who finished at 9-under-par.

Harman held the 54-hole lead at the 2017 U.S. Open played at Erin Hills in Erin, Wisconsin. He entered the final round one stroke clear of three players, at 12 under par, and was the first time he had played in the final group of a major during the final round. He finished in a tie for second place with Hideki Matsuyama, four strokes behind winner Brooks Koepka, following a final round 72.

Harman finished in solo second at the 2022 World Wide Technology Championship at Mayakoba, four shots behind winner Russell Henley. This was Harman's best finish on the PGA Tour for over five years. He followed this up with a tie for second in his next appearance at the RSM Classic, two shots behind winner Adam Svensson.

Personal life
Harman resides in Sea Island, Georgia with his wife Kelly Van Slyke.

Amateur wins
2003 U.S. Junior Amateur
2005 Players Amateur, Georgia Amateur
2007 Porter Cup
2009 Dogwood Invitational

Professional wins (4)

PGA Tour wins (2)

eGolf Professional Tour wins (1)

Other wins (1)

Results in major championships
Results not in chronological order in 2020.

CUT = missed the half-way cut
"T" indicates a tie for a place
NT = No tournament due to COVID-19 pandemic

Summary

Most consecutive cuts made – 3 (three times, current)
Longest streak of top-10s – 1 (twice, current)

Results in The Players Championship

CUT = missed the halfway cut
"T" indicates a tie for a place
C = Canceled after the first round due to the COVID-19 pandemic

Results in World Golf Championships
Results not in chronological order before 2015.

1Canceled due to COVID-19 pandemic

QF, R16, R32, R64 = Round in which player lost in match play
"T" = tied
NT = No tournament
Note that the Championship and Invitational were discontinued from 2022.

U.S. national team appearances
Amateur
Walker Cup: 2005 (winners), 2009 (winners)
Palmer Cup: 2006, 2007 (winners)

See also
2011 PGA Tour Qualifying School graduates

References

External links

University of Georgia Bulldogs profile 

American male golfers
Georgia Bulldogs men's golfers
PGA Tour golfers
Golfers from Savannah, Georgia
Left-handed golfers
People from Glynn County, Georgia
1987 births
Living people